Sophia Jane Myles (born 18 March 1980) is an English actress. She is best known in film for portraying Lady Penelope Creighton-Ward in Thunderbirds (2004), Isolde in Tristan & Isolde (2006), Darcy in Transformers: Age of Extinction (2014), Erika in Underworld (2003) and Underworld: Evolution (2006) and  Freya in Outlander (2008).

Initially hoping to study philosophy at University of Cambridge, for which she secured a place, Myles instead turned to acting after television writer Julian Fellowes saw her perform in a school play, casting her in his series The Prince and the Pauper (1996). After this, Myles continued to receive work in films such as Mansfield Park (1999), From Hell (2001) and The Abduction Club (2002), but her breakthrough role came in the form of Erika in Underworld (2003) before she won the iconic role of Lady Penelope Creighton-Ward in Thunderbirds (2004) propelling her to international stardom.

Following on from this success, Myles moved to Hollywood where she played the main role of Isolde in the epic romantic film Tristan & Isolde (2006) before starring in films including Underworld: Evolution (2006), Art School Confidential (2006), Dracula (2006), Hallam Foe (2007), Outlander (2008), The Damned (2013), Transformers: Age of Extinction (2014) and Blackwood (2015).

Myles has also received critical acclaim for her television work, particularly as Madame de Pompadour in the Doctor Who episode "The Girl in the Fireplace" (2006), Beth Turner in Moonlight (2007–2008), Beth Bailey in Spooks (2010) and Rebecca Bishop in A Discovery of Witches (2018–2021).

Myles won a BAFTA for Best Actress for her role as Kate in Hallam Foe (2007) and was also nominated for a BIFA at the British Independent Film Awards for the same film. She has also won several other awards at various other film festivals across the world.

Early life
Myles was born in London. Her mother, Jane (née Allan), works in educational publishing, and her father, Peter R. Myles, was a retired Church of England vicar in Isleworth, West London. Her paternal grandmother was Russian, and Myles refers to herself as "half-Welsh, half-Russian". She grew up in Notting Hill and attended Fox Primary School. At the age of 11, she moved with her family to Isleworth and attended The Green School. Following success at her A Levels she secured a place at the University of Cambridge to study philosophy, but chose to pursue an acting career after being spotted by Julian Fellowes in a school play and shortly after had a small role in his television production of The Prince and the Pauper in 1996.

Career

Since 1996, Myles has appeared in a number of films and television productions. Following her success in The Prince and the Pauper, Myles made her film debut in Mansfield Park (1999) and had a small role in Guest House Paradiso (1999). After roles in the television series Heartbeat and Foyle's War, Myles starred as Victoria Abberline in the thriller film From Hell (2001) alongside Johnny Depp with Myles playing his wife. Myles played a main role in the comedy-romance film The Abduction Club (2002) before then playing the role of Erika in the 2003 vampire film Underworld with Kate Beckinsale, and reprised the character in its sequel, Underworld: Evolution (2006).

In 2003, she also starred in the thriller Out of Bounds and played Lady Penelope in Thunderbirds (2004), the film version of the classic television show of the same name. Myles initially had the choice to star in either Thunderbirds or Troy but she chose the former as she said "Lady Penelope is such an iconic character".  In 2005, Myles starred in the two-part war drama miniseries Colditz with Damian Lewis and Tom Hardy. In 2006, she co-starred as Isolde in the epic romantic drama Tristan & Isolde opposite James Franco and produced by Ridley Scott.

Myles appeared as Madame de Pompadour in the 2006 Doctor Who episode "The Girl in the Fireplace", which is often referred to as one of the best episodes of the series. The episode was nominated for a Nebula Award and won the 2007 Hugo Award for Best Dramatic Presentation, Short Form. Myles also had roles as Gwenda Halliday in the British detective drama Agatha Christie's Marple: Sleeping Murder and Sophie Amsden in American thriller Covert One: The Hades Factor on television before starring in the 2006 comedy film Art School Confidential. Also in 2006, she appeared as Lucy Westenra in a BBC adaptation of Dracula.

In 2007, Myles was cast as Beth Turner in the popular CBS supernatural television drama Moonlight, a role she would play until the show's end in 2008. Moonlight won Best New Drama in the 2007 People's Choice Awards. Myles was nominated for the Best Actress Award in 2007 for her role as Kate in Hallam Foe from the British Independent Film Award committee, for which she also received a BAFTA Scotland Award.  In 2008, she played Freya, the daughter of John Hurt's character, in the sci-fi action epic Outlander with Jim Caviezel and Ron Perlman.

After having a cameo role in the American comedy film Etienne! in 2009, in 2010 Myles joined the cast of Spooks, a BBC television series about a counter-terrorism unit in MI5, for its ninth series, playing Beth Bailey. Myles then had a starring role as Lauren in the 2013 American horror film The Damned with Peter Facinelli and Nathalia Ramos. In 2014, Myles starred as geologist Darcy Tirrel opposite Mark Wahlberg and Stanley Tucci in the sci-fi action blockbuster Transformers: Age of Extinction which was directed by Michael Bay and produced by Steven Spielberg.

Later in 2014, Myles starred as Rachel in the psychological horror film Blackwood before going on to have roles as Dr. Anna Clarke in the international action-thriller Crossing Lines and the aristocratic Lady Katherine Longmore in the miniseries Our Zoo. In 2018, Myles provided her voice for an episode of the sci-fi series Firestorm.

Myles currently plays Rebecca Bishop in the fantasy-romance television series A Discovery of Witches; the first season was released in 2018 and the second in 2021 with a third series already filmed and awaiting release. After roles in the films Two Words (2018) and November 1st (2019), for which she won Best Actress and Best Supporting Actress respectively, Myles played Ann Payne, a secret agent, in the 2020 Portuguese film Listen which was selected as the Portuguese entry for the Best International Feature Film at the 93rd Academy Awards. However, in December 2020 the film was disqualified, as more than half of its dialogue was in English. Also in 2020, Myles reprised her role as Madame de Pompadour for a minisode sequel specially written for her by Steven Moffat that aired on YouTube on 6 May 2020.

In 2021, Myles starred as Beth Barnes in the comedy-heist film Decrypted about the kidnap the creator of Bitcoin, alongside Amanda Abbington and Kevin McNally. In November 2021, she starred in the film All That Glitters playing a wealthy woman hiding the fact that she is domestically abused; a role that won her Best Actress at the New Renaissance Film Festival and the Gold Movie Awards respectively. In December 2021, Myles played Louise Campbell, Duchess of Argyll in the acclaimed BBC television mini-series A Very British Scandal with Claire Foy and Paul Bettany.

Personal life

From 2004 to 2005, Myles was in a relationship with actor Charles Dance, She has also dated Damian Lewis and musician Paul Wilson from the band Snow Patrol. Myles began dating David Tennant after filming an episode of Doctor Who. By October 2007, they had separated.

In September 2014, Myles gave birth to a son fathered by her partner James Bell, who works for the Bank of England. Her son's godmother is Myles' friend and fellow actress Celia Imrie.

Her father, Peter Myles, died on 21 March 2020 after contracting COVID-19.

Filmography

Film

Television

Music videos

Voice

Accolades

References

External links
 

1980 births
Living people
20th-century English actresses
21st-century English actresses
Actresses from London
English people of Russian descent
English people of Welsh descent
BAFTA winners (people)
English film actresses
English television actresses
English stage actresses
English child actresses
English voice actresses